Fangalabola (Deborrea malgassa) is a species of bagworm moth native to Madagascar.

These bagworms are of significance because their pupae are harvested for human consumption in quantity.

Biology
The length of the larvae is 30–40 mm, length of the bag 35–55 mm, the length of the female is approximately 25 mm.
It has a wingspan of 27–44 mm.//

Known foodplants are: Acacia dealbata, fruit trees, Hibiscus tiliaceus, Grevillea robusta, Dombeya spp., Psidium spp., Eucalyptus spp., Cupressus lusitanica, Pinus patala and Amygdalus persica.

This species occurs throughout the year in forested biotopes with reasonable humidity.

See also
 List of moths of Madagascar

References
 

Psychidae
Lepidoptera of Madagascar
Moths described in 1884
Moths of Madagascar
Moths of Africa
Edible insects